The 9th World Festival of Youth and Students was held from 28 July to 5 August 1968 in Sofia, capital city of the then People's Republic of Bulgaria. The festival attracted 20,000 people from 138 countries. Initially, the event was planned to be held in Algeria in the summer of 1965, but due to the military coup in that country the date was postponed, and Bulgaria became the new venue for the festival.

The festival took place at the height of the Chinese Cultural Revolution, and due to the Sino-Soviet split, no Chinese delegates were invited to Bulgaria. However, a group of German Maoists attended. They disrupted the opening ceremony of the festival, shouting the name of Chairman Mao and waving his portrait.

The Beatles offered to play at the festival, but the band was turned down by the organising committee.

The song "Ogromnoe nebo" ("Tremendous Sky"), performed by Edita Piekha, received several awards: a gold medal and first place in a political song contest, a gold medal for performance and poetry, as well as a silver medal for music.

References 

World Festival of Youth and Students
20th century in Sofia
1968 in Bulgaria
1968 festivals
Festivals in Bulgaria
1968 in multi-sport events
Sports festivals in Bulgaria